Liu Zhe is a People's Liberation Army Navy officer serving as the captain of the Chinese aircraft carrier Liaoning since May 2016.

Biography
Liu was born into a military family. After graduating from Chinese People's Public Security University in 1993, he was recruited into military service. He completed his doctor's degree in science of strategy from PLA Academy of Military Science. After graduation, he became an officer on the frigate Jiaxing, and four years later he was promoted to the rank of captain. In 2016, he was appointed captain of the Chinese aircraft carrier Liaoning replacing Zhang Zheng.

References

Living people
Chinese People's Public Security University alumni
PLA Academy of Military Science alumni
People's Liberation Army Navy personnel
Year of birth missing (living people)